Lu Kemp is a theatre director and dramaturge. She trained on the Laboratory of Movement course at L'École Internationale de Théâtre Jacques Lecoq, Paris, and with Anne Bogart’s SITI Company in New York. In March 2016, she was appointed Artistic Director of Perth Theatre in Scotland.

Theatre

Radio plays

Notes:

Sources:
 Lu Kemp's radio play listing at Diversity website
 Lu Kemp's radio play listing at RadioListings website

References

BBC Radio drama directors
BBC radio producers
British theatre directors
British radio directors
Women radio directors
Dramaturges
Living people
Year of birth missing (living people)
Women radio producers